Kennedy Building may refer to:

in the United States (by state then city)
Kennedy Building (West Yellowstone, Montana), listed on the NRHP in Gallatin County
 Kennedy Building (Omaha, Nebraska), listed on the NRHP in Douglas County
Kennedy-Worthington Blocks, Springfield, Massachusetts, listed on the NRHP in Hampden County
Kennedy-Warren Apartment Building, Washington, D.C., listed on the NRHP in Northwest Quadrant
Robert F. Kennedy Department of Justice Building, Washington, D.C.

See also
Kennedy House (disambiguation)